Oladipupo "Ladi" Babalola (born 4 August 1968) is a retired Nigerian international footballer. He has three caps for Nigerian U-20 national team from FIFA U-20 World Cup played in Chile.

Early career 
Babalola started his coaching career at Tervarit youth teams and JS Hercules in Finland. During his first season with Js Hercules he led the team to gain a promotion to Kolmonen, Finnish third division and in his second season his team finished on 6th place and thus secured a place in the third division also for next season. Ladi holds a UEFA certified coaching license.

Career 
In 2012 Ladi was appointed as a head coach of Bangladesh-based professional team Brothers Union.
In 2014–15, Babalola was appointed as the head coach of Bangladesh-based professional team Feni Soccer club and in 2015–16 he was still with Feni soccer club .

External links

FIFA U-20 World Cup squads 1987
Jalkapalloseura Hercules

Living people
Yoruba sportspeople
1969 births
Nigerian footballers
Association football defenders
Association football midfielders
Nigeria under-20 international footballers
Nigeria international footballers
Nigerian expatriate footballers
Nigerian football managers
Expatriate footballers in Finland
Sportspeople from Lagos
JS Hercules players
JS Hercules managers